The Rip Tide is the third studio album by the American indie folk band Beirut, released on August 30, 2011.

The album debuted at No. 88 on the Billboard 200, and peaked at No. 80 a month later. The album has sold 93,000 copies in the US as of August 2015. The album has received mostly positive reviews.

Recording
Beirut's Zach Condon decided to write the album after a rough tour in Brazil, where he suffered a perforated eardrum and was involved in a stage invasion. Unlike previous Beirut albums, The Rip Tide was more reflective of places closer to home; for example, the song "Santa Fe" was a homage to Condon's hometown. Condon reflected on that, saying "The vagabond thing – that was a teenage fantasy that I lived out in a big way. Music, to me, was escapism. And now I'm doing everything that is the opposite [of that] in my life. I'm married. I've got a house. I've got a dog. So it felt ridiculous, the narrative of what my career was supposed to be, compared to what I was actually trying to attempt in my life."

Influenced by the recording of For Emma, Forever Ago, Condon wrote The Rip Tide while he spent six months in isolation living in a Bethel, New York winter cabin. Unlike Beirut's previous albums, the music was recorded as a band playing together instead of laying down individual tracks one at a time. However, the lyrics were only added by Condon after all the music had been recorded.

Release
The first news that Beirut was recording a new album came in the winter of 2010–11 with an announcement from Ba Da Bing records:

After recording, Beirut toured throughout Europe and the US, playing several songs that would appear on the album, including, "Vagabond," "Santa Fe," and "Port of Call.". On June 3, 2011, the band released The Rip Tides first single, "East Harlem," with "Goshen" as its B-side, with a physical release on June 6, 2011. On June 7, 2011, Beirut officially announced the existence of the new album, disclosing both the title and track listing.

The Rip Tide was originally going to be released on August 30, 2011. Unlike previous albums, The Rip Tide was self-released on Condon's own Pompeii Records. However, an internet leak pushed the album's iTunes Store released date to August 2, 2011. The physical edition of the album was released in a cloth-bound, embossed package as a thank you gift to people who wanted a physical version.

Critical reception

The Rip Tide received large acclaim from contemporary music critics. At Metacritic, which assigns a normalized rating out of 100 to reviews from mainstream critics, the album received an average score of 78, based on 34 reviews, which indicates "generally favorable reviews".

Tim Jonze of The Guardian, in a positive review, wrote "It's less flashy than previous efforts, but the thrill here is of witnessing a songwriter's talent maturing." NME's Laura Snapes also gave the album a positive review, writing "These ideas of acceptance, hope and personal reflection make The Rip Tide an accomplished, restrained record, which sees Condon forgetting his travels, and forging his own native sound." Slant Magazine's Jesse Cataldo wrote that while "The songs are often still a little too cute, too twee and self-satisfied," Cataldo concluded that the songs were nevertheless "just as catchy without the burden of self-reflexive exoticism." AllMusic's James Christopher Monger enjoyed the album's more personal songs, writing "Condon spends much of Rip Tide writing in first person, and it lends an air of much needed intimacy to the always gorgeous, yet historically elusive Beirut sound."

PopMatters' Eric Brown, on the other hand, gave the album a more mixed review, writing "Beirut too often moves away from its world-folk origins into a more generic sound, one that has more in common with an Apple commercial than their breakthrough album. It's not necessarily a bad move — the songs are all well-composed and technically challenging — but The Rip Tide lacks an emotional core, or at the very least, an interesting hook in lieu of something more substantial." Brown continued: "I have to think that as an EP, The Rip Tide would be a rousing success. But as it is, there are just too many bland, uninspiring tracks that drag down the whole experience." Benjamin Boles of NOW was also less receptive to the album's sound, writing "Unfortunately, it all feels a bit too manicured and restrained. As easy as it is to hit repeat when the disc ends, trying to remember standout moments is another story. It’s a solid album, but too conservative to make many converts."

Accolades
The Rip Tide has appeared on a few end-of-year lists. Paste ranked The Rip Tide #20 on its list of the top 50 albums of 2011, while Mojo ranked the album #22 on its end-of-year list.MOJO's Top 50 Albums Of 2011. Stereogum. 2 December 2011. Retrieved 11 December 2011.

In popular culture

The song "Goshen" from the album appeared in the series finale of season 5 of the NBC show Chuck.

Track listing

Personnel
Zach Condon - vocals, ukulele, trumpet, piano, percussion, pedal bass, organ, pump organ
Perrin Cloutier - accordion, piano, pump organ, cello
Paul Collins - bass guitar, upright bass
Ben Lanz - trombone, piano, tuba
Nick Petree - drums, percussion
Kelly Pratt - trumpet, euphonium, french horn, vocalsGuest appearances'
Sharon Van Etten - vocals
Heather Trost - violin, vocals

Charts

Release history

References

2011 albums
Beirut (band) albums
Self-released albums